The Akhaltsikhe uezd was a county (uezd) of the Tiflis Governorate of the Caucasus Viceroyalty of the Russian Empire, and then of Democratic Republic of Georgia, with its administrative center in Akhaltsikh (present-day Akhaltsikhe). The uezd bordered the Gori uezd and the Kutaisi Governorate to the north, the Akhalkalaki uezd to the east, the Ardahan Okrug of the Kars Oblast to the south, and the Batum Okrug of the Batum Oblast to the west. The area of the uezd roughly corresponded to the contemporary Samtskhe-Javakheti region of Georgia.

History 
The territory of the Akhaltsikhe uezd, entered into the Kutais Governorate of the Russian Empire following the Russo-Turkish War of 1828. By 1840, the Аkhaltsikhe uezd was formed as a civilian district of the Tiflis Governorate. In 1874, the Akhalkalaki uezd was detached from it as a separate county.

Following the Russian Revolution, the Akhaltsikhe uezd was incorporated into the short-lived Democratic Republic of Georgia.

Lord Curzon during the Paris Peace Conference assessed the ethnographic situation in the southwestern uezds of the Tiflis Governorate:On the grounds of nationality, therefore, these districts ought to belong to Armenia, but they command the heart of Georgia strategically, and on the whole it would seem equitable to assign them to Georgia, and give their Armenian inhabitants the option of emigration into the wide territories assigned to the Armenians towards the south-west.

Administrative divisions 
The subcounties (uchastoks) of the Akhaltsikhe uezd in 1913 were as follows:

Demographics

Russian Empire Census 
The plurality of the population indicated Turkish to be their mother tongue, with significant Armenian, Tatar, and Georgian speaking minorities.

Kavkazskiy kalendar 

See also 
 History of the administrative division of Russia

Notes

References

Bibliography 

Caucasus Viceroyalty (1801–1917)
Tiflis Governorate
Kutaisi Governorate
Uezds of Tiflis Governorate
Modern history of Georgia (country)
1880 establishments in the Russian Empire
States and territories established in 1880
States and territories disestablished in 1918